Lenrie Olatokunbo Aina (born 20 December 1950) is a professor of Library and Information Science, and former National Librarian/Chief Executive Officer of the National Library of Nigeria (NLN) Abuja.

Education 
Professor Aina obtained a bachelor's degree in Chemistry from the University of Lagos, in 1974; a Postgraduate Diploma in Librarianship, from the University of Ibadan, in 1976 and an M.Phil. Information Science, City University, London,1980. In 1986, he bagged PhD in Library Studies, from the University of Ibadan, Ibadan.

Career 
Aina began his librarianship career at the University of Ibadan Library between 1976–1978. Aina earned a Professor of Library and Information Science at the University of Ilorin, Nigeria and the University of Botswana respectively. In addition, Professor Aina is the Pioneer Editor-in-Chief of the African Journal of Library, Archives and Information Science, the only library and information science journal in Africa covered by the World acclaimed Web of Science. His research interests span all areas of library and information science. This speaks of his versatility and grip on his chosen profession.

 Professor of Library and Information Science, University of Ilorin, 2008
 Professor, Department of Library and Information Technology, Federal University of Technology, Minna, 2008
 Professor, Department of Library and Information Studies, University of Botswana, 1998-2007
 Associate Professor, Department of Library and Information Studies, University of Botswana, 1992-1998
 Senior Lecturer, Department of Library and Information Studies, University of Botswana, 1989-1992.
 Senior Lecturer, Department of Library, Archival and Information Studies, University of Ibadan, 1986-1989
 Lecturer 1, Department of Library Studies, University of Ibadan, 1983-1986
 Lecturer II, Department of Library Studies, University of Ibadan, 1981-1983
 Assistant Lecturer, Department of Library Studies, University of Ibadan, 1978-1981
 Sub librarian, University of Ibadan Library, Nigeria 1977-1978.
 Assistant Librarian, University of Ibadan Library, Nigeria 1976-1977

Professional Membership 
Professor Lenrie Olatokunbo Aina is a member  and fellow of the Nigerian Library Association; Member, American Library Association and Member, Institute of Information Scientists.

Awards

Publications 

 Aina, L. O. (2004). Library and information science text for Africa. Ibadan, Nigeria: Third World Information Services Limited.
 Aina L.O. (2004). Research in Information Science: an African perspective. Ibadan. Sterling Horden.
 World  Library  and  Information Congress: 73RD IFLA GENERAL CONFERENCE AND COUNCIL 19–23 August 2007, Durban, South Africa http://www.ifla.org/iv/ifla73/index.htm
 Aina, L.O. and I. M. Mabawonku  (1997) The literature of the information profession in Anglophone Africa: characteristics, trends and future directions. Journal of Information Science, 23 (4) 321–326.
 Aina, L. O., & Ajiferuke, I. S. Y. (2002). Research methodologies in information Sciences. Research in information sciences: An African perspective. Stirling-Horden. Ibadan.
 Aina, L. O., & Mabawonku, I. M. (1996). Management of a scholarly journal in Africa: A success story. AFRICAN JOURNAL OF LIBRARY ARCHIVES AND INFORMATION SCIENCE, 6, 63-84.
 Aina, L.O. The provision of agricultural information to farmers and extension officers: a catalyst in increased agricultural production in Africa. Unpublished paper, 1989. 6p.
 Aina, L. O., Mutula, S. M., & Tiamiyu, M. A. (Eds.). (2008). Information and knowledge management in the digital age: concepts, technologies and African perspectives. Third World Information Services Limited.
 Aina, L.O (2002). The literature of the information profession in Anglophone Africa: characteristics, trends and future directions. African Journal of Library, Archives and Information Science, 12(2) 167-172.
 Aina, L. O. (2007, September). Appropriate curriculum for library and information science schools in Nigeria: the role of the Nigerian Library Association. In A paper presented at the conference of the Nigerian Library Association. Nigerian Library Association, Abuja, Nigeria.
 Aina, L. O. (2003, September). Strengthening information provision in Nigerian university libraries: The digital option. In 41st Annual National Conference & AGM of the Nigerian Library Association at Tarker Foundation, Markurdi (pp. 7–12).
 Aina, L.O.(2005,January). Towards an Ideal Library and Information Studies (LIS) Curriculum for Africa: Some Preliminary Thoughts. 165 – 185.
 Tiamiyu, M. A., & Aina, L. O. (2008). Information and knowledge management in the digital society: An African perspective. LO Aina, SM Mutula and MA Tiamiyu, MA (eds.), Information and knowledge management in the digital age: Concepts, technologies and African perspectives, 3-27.
 Aina, L. O. (1989). Education and training of librarians for agricultural information work in Africa. IAALD Quarterly Bulletin, 34(1), 23-26.
 Aina, L.O. (1983). Access to scientific and technological information in Nigeria: Problems and prospects. Nigerian Libraries 19 (1-3): 35-41.
 Aina, L.O. (1985) Availability of periodical titles cited in the literature of Nigeria's scientific research in Nigerian libraries. Nigerian libraries 21(1):23-27.
 Aina, L.O., A.A. Alemna and Mabawonku, Iyabo (Eds.) (2005) Improving the Quality of Library and Information Science Journals in West Africa: Proceedings of the Stakeholders Conference, Sponsored by INASP 7–8 December 2005, Ibadan, Nigeria. Ibadan: Third World Information Services, 155p.
 Aina , L. O. (2012a) Libraries: Facilitators of Knowledge Generation. Paper Presented at the Ghana Library Association 50th Anniversary Seminar, June 22, 2012 Accra, Ghana.

See also 

 Nigerian Library Association
 National Library of Nigeria
 University of Ilorin
 University of Botswana

References

1960 births
Living people
Nigerian librarians
Academic staff of the University of Ilorin